Ehrenfeld is a German surname. This is generally considered to be an habitational name, taken on from any of several places named Ehrenfeld.

Ehrenfeld is an ancient Christian surname, but there are also a significant number of Jewish people bearing it. Notable people with the surname include:

 Akiva Ehrenfeld (1923–2012), president of Kiryat Mattersdorf
 Shmuel Ehrenfeld, the Mattersdorfer Rav
 Rachel Ehrenfeld, Director of the American center for Democracy

German-language surnames